DWKY (91.5 FM), broadcasting as 91.5 Win Radio, is a radio station owned by Mabuhay Broadcasting System and operated by Manuelito "Manny" Luzon's ZimZam Management, Inc. It serves as the flagship station of the Win Radio Network. The station's studio and transmitter are located at the 40th Floor, Summit One Tower, Shaw Blvd., Mandaluyong.

As of Q4 2022, 91.5 Win Radio is the 3rd most-listened to FM radio station in Metro Manila, based on a survey commissioned by Kantar Media Philippines and Kapisanan ng mga Brodkaster ng Pilipinas.

History

1985–1998: KY 91.5
On October 1, 1985, the station started carrying the call letters DWKY and rebranded as KY 91.5. Headed by Al Torres (formerly from 99.5 RT, now voiceover of GMA currently based in Canada), it carried a broad based Top 40 format, playing well-crafted music from Mondays to Saturdays, as well as oldies music during Sundays. Ben Tulfo and Daniel Razon were two of the station's disc jockeys

1998–2003: K91 
In 1998, Manny Luzon became FM Operations Consultant for MBSI. KY 91.5 then became K91 FM, which mainly played novelty and contemporary pop music.

2003–2011: Energy FM
In 2003, Ultrasonic Broadcasting System took over the station's operations and rebranded it as 91.5 Energy FM, with a recall byline "'Wag mong sabihing radyo, sabihin mo Energy" ("Don't say radio, say Energy") in order to compete with other local stations. Its studios moved to SYSU Building in Quezon City.

From July to November 2006, The Edge Radio of United Christian Broadcasters occupied the 6pm-6am timeslot of Energy FM. In 2008, it ranked second among Metro Manila stations. In 2009, DWKY, together with its provincial stations, won in the 18th KBP Golden Dove Awards as Best FM Station of the year.

In 2010, Manny Luzon eventually left UBSI to join Progressive Broadcasting Corporation (where he transformed NU 107 to 107.5 Win Radio). After 8 years on 91.5, Energy FM signed off on June 1, 2011, and transferred to the 106.7 FM frequency a month later.

2011–2014: Big Radio

On June 1, 2011, at 1:15am, 91.5 Big Radio was launched. ZimZam Management took over the station's operations, making it the sister station of 107.5 Win Radio. (station owner Progressive Broadcasting Corporation acquired a minority share of MBSI and also took over management of sister station DZXQ) Bigman Marco (formerly known as Sgt. Mark of Energy FM) was the first to go on board, followed by a few jocks from the Energy FM roster.

As part of Energy FM's transition to their new frequency, DWKY used a partial stinger of the Energy FM slogan "'Wag mong sabihing radyo," until Energy FM moved to 106.7 FM. During its first 4 months, it reused its old studios in Centerpoint Bldg. in Pasig until September, when it moved to AIC Gold Tower in the same city.

In July 2011, a month after the rebranding, Vanguard Radio Network (VRN) filed a legal trademark infringement case at the Intellectual Property Office against Luzon. He was accused of using the said brand without any permission from VRN, citing that VRN already owned the said brand alongside the "Big Sound FM" brand. The case was upheld in 2017, and Luzon violated Section 147 of the Intellectual Property Code of the Philippines.

In late March 2012, Big Radio was ranked #3 in the FM radio ratings, based on the KBP Radio Research Council.

2014–present: Win Radio
On June 26, 2014, 91.5 Big Radio signed off after airing for 3 years. It was replaced by 91.5 Win Radio a day later on June 27, 2014, which used to air on 107.5 MHz for 4 years. Progressive Broadcasting Corporation's content provider Breakthrough and Milestones Productions International (an affiliate of Members Church of God International) took over 107.5 FM and launched Wish 1075 later on August 10, 2014.

In 2015, the station moved to its current home in Summit One Tower in Mandaluyong.

Notable personalities
Mr. Fu  (formerly with 106.7 Energy FM)

See also
Ultrasonic Broadcasting System
104.7 Brigada News FM
106.7 Energy FM
Wish 1075

References

Energy FM
Radio stations established in 1980